Shang-Hua Teng (born 1964) is a Chinese-American computer scientist. He is the Seeley G. Mudd Professor of Computer Science and Mathematics at the University of Southern California. Previously, he was the chairman of the Computer Science Department at the Viterbi School of Engineering of the University of Southern California.

Biography
Teng was born in China in 1964. His father, Dr. Teng Zhanhong, was a professor of civil engineering at the Taiyuan University of Technology. His mother, Li Guixin, was an administrator at the same university.

Teng graduated with BA in electrical engineering and BS in computer science, both from Shanghai Jiao Tong University in 1985. He obtained MS in computer science from the University of Southern California in 1988. Teng holds a Ph.D. in computer science from Carnegie Mellon University (in 1991).

Prior to joining USC in 2009, Teng was a professor at Boston University.  He has also taught at MIT, the University of Minnesota, and the University of Illinois at Urbana-Champaign. He has worked at Xerox PARC,  NASA Ames Research Center, Intel Corporation, IBM Almaden Research Center, Akamai Technologies, Microsoft Research Redmond, Microsoft Research New England and Microsoft Research Asia.

Recognition
In 2008 Teng was awarded the Gödel Prize for his joint work on smoothed analysis of algorithms with Daniel Spielman. They went to win the prize again in 2015 for their contribution on "nearly-linear-time Laplacian solvers". In 2009, he received the Fulkerson Prize given by the American Mathematical Society and the Mathematical Programming Society.

Teng is a Fellow of the Association for Computing Machinery (ACM) as well as an Alfred P. Sloan Research Fellow. He was named a SIAM Fellow in the 2021 class of fellows, "for contributions to scalable algorithm design, mesh generation, and algorithmic game theory, and for pioneering smoothed analysis of linear programming".

Personal life 
In 2003, Teng married Diana Irene Williams, then a Ph.D. student of history at Harvard University.

References

External links
 Shang-Hua Teng's personal homepage at USC
 
 

1964 births
Living people
American computer scientists
Chinese computer scientists
Boston University faculty
Carnegie Mellon University alumni
Chinese emigrants to the United States
Gödel Prize laureates
IBM employees
Intel people
Researchers in geometric algorithms
Fellows of the Association for Computing Machinery
Fellows of the Society for Industrial and Applied Mathematics
Massachusetts Institute of Technology faculty
Microsoft Research people
Shanghai Jiao Tong University alumni
Sloan Research Fellows
University of Illinois Urbana-Champaign faculty
University of Minnesota faculty
USC Viterbi School of Engineering alumni
University of Southern California faculty
Scientists at PARC (company)
Simons Investigator